Hai Inn Temple, is a Buddhist monastery in Singapore. The present premises are located at Brickland Road in Tengah, Singapore.

Overview
Hai Inn Temple was founded in 1928 and is one of the oldest Buddhist temples in Singapore. Regular activities include dharma classes and monthly chanting sessions. The temple has one of the biggest bells of its kind in Singapore, weighing 7 tonnes, with a height of 2.75 metres and 1.7 metres wide.

See also
 Buddhism in Singapore

References

Buddhist organisations based in Singapore
Buddhist temples in Singapore